Lindsay Lohan is an American actress and singer-songwriter. Lohan made her motion picture debut in the 1998 family comedy The Parent Trap prior to appearances in Freaky Friday in 2003, Confessions of a Teenage Drama Queen and Mean Girls, both in 2004. Having begun showcasing her singing through her acting roles as well as recording songs for the soundtracks of Freaky Friday and Confessions of a Teenage Drama Queen, Lohan launched a music career in 2004. Her debut studio album, Speak was released by Casablanca Records in December 2004. The album spawned three singles, "Rumors" (released September 21, 2004), "Over" (released December 14, 2004) and "First" (released May 8, 2005).

Film and Television Awards

Audience Awards

Critics' Awards

Festival Awards

Other industry awards

Screen Actors Guild Awards

VH1 Big In Awards

Diversity Awards

TRL Awards

Capri Awards

Premiere Magazine's 12th Annual Premiere Women Awards

Kids Choice Awards Australia

Webby Awards

|-
| style="text-align:center;"| 2010
| style="text-align:center;"| Lindsay Lohan's Eharmony Profile
| style="text-align:center;"| Online Film & Video - Viral
| style="text-align:center;"

Music awards

Radio Disney Awards

Teen Choice Awards

Kids Choice Awards Asia

MTV Video Music Awards

MTV Asia Awards

Music Video Production Awards 

|-
| rowspan="2" | 2005
| rowspan="2" | "Rumors"
| Best Colorist/Telecine
| 
|-
| Best Make-Up
|

Fashion and Style Awards

Sohu Fashion Achievement Awards 
Annual Chinese ceremony awarding the best in fashion and style by both local and international celebrities.

Notes 
 Shared with Rachel McAdams, Lacey Chabert, and Amanda Seyfried.
 Shared with Jonathan Bennett.
 Shared with Harry Belafonte, Joy Bryant, Nick Cannon, Emilio Estevez, Laurence Fishburne, Brian Geraghty, Heather Graham, Anthony Hopkins, Helen Hunt, Joshua Jackson, David Krumholtz, Ashton Kutcher, Shia LaBeouf, William H. Macy, Svetlana Metkina, Demi Moore, Freddy Rodriguez, Martin Sheen, Christian Slater, Sharon Stone, Jacob Vargas, Mary Elizabeth Winstead, and Elijah Wood.
 Shared with Lindsay Lohan.
 Shared with Woody Harrelson, Tommy Lee Jones, Garrison Keillor, Kevin Kline, Lindsay Lohan, Virginia Madsen, John C. Reilly, Maya Rudolph, Lily Tomlin, L.Q. Jones, Sue Scott and Tim Russell.

References 

Lists of awards received by American actor